Enoplognatha caricis is a species of cobweb spider in the family Theridiidae. It is found in Europe, Turkey, a range within Russia (European to the Far East), China, Korea, and Japan.

References

Theridiidae
Articles created by Qbugbot
Spiders described in 1876